The following lists events that happened in 1931 in El Salvador.

Incumbents
President: Pío Romero Bosque (until 1 March), Arturo Araujo (1 March - 2 December), Civic Directory (2 December - 4 December), Maximiliano Hernández Martínez (starting 4 December)
Vice President: Gustavo Vides (until 1 March), Maximiliano Hernández Martínez (1 March - 2 December), Vacant (starting 2 December)

Events

January
 11–13 January – Voters in El Salvador voted Labor candidate Arturo Araujo as President with 46.65% of the vote in El Salvador's first free and fair election.

March
 1 March – Arturo Araujo was sworn in as President of El Salvador. Maximiliano Hernández Martínez was sworn in as Vice President.

December
 2 December – The Armed Forces of El Salvador deposed President Araujo in a military coup d'état and established the Civic Directory.
 4 December – General Maximiliano Hernández Martínez, previously Vice President of El Salvador under Araujo, became Acting President of El Salvador.

Undated

 The National Pro Patria Party was established.

References

 
El Salvador
1930s in El Salvador
Years of the 20th century in El Salvador
El Salvador